The Vanuatu national under-18 football team is the national U-18 team of Vanuatu and is controlled by the Vanuatu Football Federation.

History
The Vanuatu national under-18 football team was founded in 2019 and invited for the OFC Youth Development Tournament 2019. This tournament, established by the Oceania Football Confederation and UEFA, was created so that the gap between the U-16 and U-19 could be make smaller.

Competition record

Matches

2019

Current squad
The following players were called up for the OFC Youth Development Tournament 2019 from 15 - 23 August 2019, held in Port Vila, Vanuatu.

Caps and goals updated as of 16 August 2019 after the game against New Caledonia U18.

References

External links
 Vanuatu Football Federation official website

under-18
National under-18 association football teams